Ricky Neal Horton (born July 30, 1959) is an American former Major League Baseball (MLB) left-handed pitcher who played for the St. Louis Cardinals, Chicago White Sox, and Los Angeles Dodgers from 1984 to 1990. As of 2022, he is a radio broadcaster for the Cardinals.

Early life and amateur career
Horton was born in Poughkeepsie, New York. He graduated from F. D. Roosevelt High School, in nearby Hyde Park. Horton attended and played college baseball at the University of Virginia. Horton played collegiate summer baseball for the Chatham A's of the Cape Cod Baseball League in 1978 and was named a league all-star. During the 1980 season, he led the Cavaliers in innings pitched (66.2), earned run average (2.70) and strikeouts (70).

Playing career
Horton was drafted by the St. Louis Cardinals in the 4th round of the 1980 amateur draft. Horton's first major league hit came on May 21, 1984, off Nolan Ryan.

In 1984, Horton won a career-high nine games as a rookie for the Cardinals. While with the Cardinals, he appeared in the 1985 World Series and 1987 World Series. He also pitched in the 1988 World Series as a member of the Dodgers and got a World Series ring.

Coaching and broadcasting career
In 1991, Horton was a minor league pitching coach in the Cleveland Indians farm system. In 1993, he became the director of the St. Louis Fellowship of Christian Athletes.

In 1997, Horton began filling in on Cardinals television broadcasts on FSN Midwest and radio broadcasts on the Cardinals Radio Network. In 2003, he joined the three-man FSN Midwest television broadcast team, working roughly 100 games per year as well as post-game analysis. As of 2022, he provides color commentary on KMOX radio broadcasts.

Personal
Horton briefly appeared in the film Field of Dreams, shown pitching for the White Sox in a scene where Ray Kinsella's young daughter is watching baseball on television.

Horton and his wife, Ann, reside in St. Louis.

References

External links
 
Ricky Horton at Baseball Almanac

1959 births
Living people
Baseball players from New York (state)
Gastonia Cardinals players
St. Petersburg Cardinals players
Arkansas Travelers players
Louisville Redbirds players
Springfield Cardinals players
Denver Zephyrs players
Colorado Springs Sky Sox players
Canton-Akron Indians players
Chicago White Sox players
Los Angeles Dodgers players
Major League Baseball broadcasters
Major League Baseball pitchers
Sportspeople from Poughkeepsie, New York
St. Louis Cardinals announcers
St. Louis Cardinals players
Virginia Cavaliers baseball players
Chatham Anglers players